Frøyset Church is a parish church of the Church of Norway in Masfjorden Municipality in Vestland county, Norway. It is located in the village of Frøyset. It sits at the mouth of the small Frøysetelva river, along the shore of the Frøysetfjorden. It is one of the three churches in the Masfjorden parish which is part of the Nordhordland prosti (deanery) in the Diocese of Bjørgvin. The white, wooden church was built in a long church design in 1937 using plans drawn up by the architect Thorolf Hals Frølich. The church seats about 180 people and it serves the northwestern part of the municipality.

History
As early as 1919, the people of northwestern Masfjorden began asking for their own church. In 1928, the parish council approved the plan to build a new chapel at Frøyset and this was also approved by the Ministry of Church Affairs in 1929. After this, there was much time spent planning and debating the location and design of the new church. In 1935, the land was purchased and permission was granted to begin construction. The church was consecrated in 1937 by the Bishop Andreas Fleischer. In 1959, electric heating and lighting were installed. In 1969–1970, the church was expanded with the addition of a kitchen and parish hall off the north side of the church. It also included a new sacristy and coat room. The new addition was designed by Kåre Frølich.

Media gallery

See also
List of churches in Bjørgvin

References

Masfjorden
Churches in Vestland
Long churches in Norway
Wooden churches in Norway
20th-century Church of Norway church buildings
Churches completed in 1937
1937 establishments in Norway